The 1995–96 Sussex County Football League season was the 71st in the history of Sussex County Football League a football competition in England.

Division One

Division One featured 17 clubs which competed in the division last season, along with three new clubs, promoted from Division Two:
Hassocks
Horsham YMCA
Mile Oak

League table

Division Two

Division Two featured 13 clubs which competed in the division last season, along with five new clubs.
Clubs relegated from Division One:
East Grinstead
Littlehampton Town
Newhaven
Clubs promoted from Division Three:
East Preston
Midhurst & Easebourne

League table

Division Three

Division Three featured twelve clubs which competed in the division last season, along with four new clubs:
Crawley Down Village, joined from the Mid-Sussex League
Lingfield, relegated from Division Two
Storrington, relegated from Division Two
Thomson Athletic

Also, Sunallon changed name to Sun Alliance.

League table

References

1995-96
1995–96 in English football leagues